Zoran Ratković (born 31 December 1978) is a retired Croatian football player.

Career

Ratković was born in Belišće. He started playing at Podravac Bistrinci, moved to NK Belišće at the age of 11. At the age of 14, he was scouted by and moved to Hajduk Split. After eight years Hajduk Split, Ratković moved to Cibalia in 2000.

In 2007, he was signed by German 2. Bundesliga side Eintracht Braunschweig during the winter break. The club was at the bottom of the league at the time, and brought in 11 new players to prevent relegation. However, results did not improve and Braunschweig made the drop to the third division. Ratković left Germany again, after having played only three league games during his brief stay, and returned to Croatia.

References

External links
 

1978 births
Living people
People from Belišće
Association football forwards
Croatian footballers
Croatia youth international footballers
HNK Hajduk Split players
HNK Cibalia players
Eintracht Braunschweig players
NK Samobor players
NK Međimurje players
HNK Trogir players
NK Belišće players
Croatian Football League players
2. Bundesliga players
First Football League (Croatia) players
Second Football League (Croatia) players
Croatian expatriate footballers
Expatriate footballers in Germany
Croatian expatriate sportspeople in Germany